Ulysses Simpson Grant Sharp Jr. (April 2, 1906 – December 12, 2001) was a United States Navy four star admiral who served as Commander in Chief, United States Pacific Fleet (CINCPACFLT) from 1963 to 1964; and Commander-in-Chief, United States Pacific Command (CINCPAC) from 1964 to 1968. He was PACOM commander during the Gulf of Tonkin Incident. Sharp was related to Ulysses S. Grant, who married Sharp's great-aunt.

Military career
Sharp was born in Chinook, Montana, and named for Ulysses S. Grant, who was married to his grandmother's sister. Raised in Fort Benton, Montana, he graduated from the United States Naval Academy in 1927. He is also a 1950 graduate of the Naval War College.

During World War II, he commanded the destroyer  in the Pacific Theater, earning two Silver Stars.

His brother, LCDR Thomas F. Sharp (USNA class of 1935), was reported lost on May 13, 1943 when his submarine  was sunk during its seventh combat patrol of the World War II Pacific campaign.

By the Korean War, he was commanding a destroyer squadron, assisting in the planning of the Inchon landing. He served as deputy chief of naval operations for policy and planning in the early 1960s.

After receiving his fourth star, Sharp took command of the Pacific Fleet in 1963, followed by command of Pacific Command. During his tenure, due to the Tonkin Gulf Incident, the U.S. increased its presence in Vietnam after the passage of the Gulf of Tonkin Resolution. Sharp's views on U.S. strategy in the war, namely massive military action, differed sharply with the Johnson administration's preference for a gradual buildup of forces.  Sharp was featured on the August 14, 1964, cover of TIME Magazine.

Awards and decorations

Post military career
After retiring from the Navy, Sharp was a critic of U.S. policy in the Vietnam War, lecturing frequently and writing articles. He wrote an article in Reader's Digest in 1969 titled We Could Have Won in Vietnam Long Ago, and in 1979 his book Strategy for Defeat: Vietnam in Retrospect  was published.

His first wife, Patricia, whom he married in 1931, died in 1986. In 1988 he married the former Nina Blake.

After suffering a fall in October 2001, Sharp's health steadily declined until he died on December 12, 2001, at his home in San Diego. He was buried in Fort Rosecrans National Cemetery.

See also

 Gulf of Tonkin incident
 McNamara Line

References

Further reading
 Ewing, James W. Admiral Sharp, Air Power and Victory: A Critical Analysis of Strategy for Defeat, Vietnam in Retrospect, by Admiral U.S.G. Sharp, USN. Maxwell AFB, AL: Air Command and Staff College, Air University, 1988. 
Marquis, Christopher . Ulysses S. Grant Sharp Jr., Vietnam War Admiral, 95 New York Times obituary, December 18, 2001
 Moïse, Edwin E. Tonkin Gulf and the Escalation of the Vietnam War. Chapel Hill: University of North Carolina Press, 1996.

External links
 

1906 births
2001 deaths
United States Navy admirals
United States Naval Academy alumni
United States Navy personnel of World War II
United States Navy personnel of the Korean War
United States Navy personnel of the Vietnam War
Recipients of the Silver Star
People from Chinook, Montana
Burials at Fort Rosecrans National Cemetery
People from Fort Benton, Montana
Grant family
Military personnel from Montana